Farjeon is a surname that may refer to:

Annabel Farjeon (1919–2004), British ballerina and author
Benjamin Farjeon (1838–1903), British novelist, playwright, printer and journalist
Eleanor Farjeon (1881–1965), English author of children's stories and plays, poetry, biography, history and satire
Harry Farjeon (1878–1948), British composer
Herbert Farjeon (1887–1945), English theatre critic, lyricist, librettist, playwright, theatre manager and researcher
J. Jefferson Farjeon (1883–1955), English crime and mystery novelist, playwright and screenwriter
Joan Jefferson Farjeon (1913–2006), English scenographer and scenic designer 
Violetta Farjeon (1923–2015), actress